Edward Schneider or Eddie Schneider may refer to:

 Eddie August Schneider (1911–1940), American aviator
 Edward L. Schneider, professor of gerontology at USC
 Edward L. Schneider (died 1939), served under Chicago political boss Tom Pendergast
 Edward M. Schneider, Wisconsin State Assemblyman